Fidel Vázquez Arroyo (born May 20, 1989, in Guadalajara, Jalisco) is a Mexican professional footballer who plays for U. de G. of Ascenso MX.

External links
Ascenso MX

Liga MX players
Living people
Mexican footballers
1989 births
Footballers from Guadalajara, Jalisco
Association football defenders
21st-century Mexican people